The Killer In You: A Tribute to Smashing Pumpkins is a 2005 tribute album, featuring a variety of artists covering songs from the American alternative rock band Smashing Pumpkins. The release was made available digitally on November 15, 2005, followed by the compact disc version three months later on January 31, 2006.

Track listing
All songs written by Billy Corgan, except where noted.

References

2005 compilation albums
The Smashing Pumpkins tribute albums